Ak Zhol may refer to:

 Ak Jol, a political party in Kyrgyzstan
 Aq Jol Democratic Party, a political party in Kazakhstan
 FC Ak-Zhol, a Kyrgyz football club based in Aravan, Kyrgyzstan
 Naghyz Aq Jol, a former political party in Kazakhstan